Scrobipalpa costella is a moth of the family Gelechiidae. It is found in western Europe.

The head is ochreous, sometimes
grey-sprinkled. Terminal joint of palpi shorter than second. Forewings reddish -ochreous, sometimes suffusedly irrorated with dark fuscous; a dark fuscous triangular costal blotch extending from 1/4 to 2/3 and reaching fold, including the black stigmata, first discal followed by another black dot obliquely beneath it; an indistinct pale angulated fascia at 3/4; often a dark fuscous terminal suffusion. Hindwings 1, grey. The larva is greyish green; dorsal and subdorsal lines sometimes darker; 2 and 3 dark purplish-brown; head and plate of 2 black.

Adults appear in September and spend the winter. After overwintering, they are on wing till June.

The larvae feed on Solanum dulcamara. They mine the leaves of their host plant. Young larvae bore in the midrib. From there, they make rather small, brownish, wrinkled blotches. Later they may create blotches that extend further from the midrib, start boring or live freely on the host plant. Pupation takes place outside of the mine. Larvae can be found from mid September to June.

References

Moths described in 1845
Scrobipalpa
Moths of Europe